Law of the Fish is the third album by The Radiators. It is their second studio album and their first major label release.

Overview
After a five-year hiatus from record-making (but not from performing), The Radiators signed with Epic Records and released their first major label album, which helped introduce their self-described "fishhead music" to a national audience. The album made it up to #139 on the Billboard 200, and the songs "Doctor, Doctor" and "Like Dreamers Do" made it to #20 and #23 respectively on the Mainstream Rock Tracks.

The songs on the album were written over a period of several years, with the oldest, "Suck the Head", bearing a 1979 copyright date. Only two of the songs, "Oh Beautiful Loser" and "Sparkplug" actually have a 1987 copyright date.

Track listing

Credits
 Ed Volker – keyboards, vocals
 Dave Malone – guitars, vocals
 Camile Baudoin – guitars, vocals
 Reggie Scanlan – bass
 Frank Bua Jr. – drums
 Glenn Sears – percussion
 Rodney Mills – producer, engineer
 Tag George – second engineer

Notes

External links
 
 

The Radiators (American band) albums
1987 albums
Epic Records albums
Albums produced by Rodney Mills